La Liga Filipina was a secret organization. It was founded by José Rizal in the house of Doroteo Ongjunco at Ilaya Street, Tondo, Manila on July 3, 1892.

The organization derived from La Solidaridad and the Propaganda movement. The purpose of La Liga Filipina was to build a new group that sought to involve the people directly in the reform movement.

The league was to be a sort of mutual aid and self-help society dispensing scholarship funds and legal aid, loaning capital and setting up cooperatives, the league became a threat to Spanish authorities that they arrested Rizal on July 6, 1892, then he was sent to Dapitan.

During the exile of Rizal, The organization became inactive, though through the efforts of Domingo Franco and Andrés Bonifacio, it was reorganized. The organization decided to declare its support for La Solidaridad and the reforms it advocated, raise funds for the paper, and defray the expenses of deputies advocating reforms for the country before the Spanish Cortes. Eventually after some disarray in the leadership of the group, the Supreme Council of the League dissolved the society.

The Liga membership split into two groups when it is about to be revealed: the conservatives formed the Cuerpo de Compromisarios which pledged to continue supporting the La Solidaridad while the radicals led by Bonifacio devoted themselves to a new and secret society, the Katipunan.

Aims

To unite the whole archipelago into one vigorous and homogeneous organization
Mutual protection in every want and necessity
Defense against all violence and injustice
Encouragement of instruction, agriculture, and commerce
Study the application of reforms

Members of La Liga Filipina

Directors
 José Rizal, founder
 Ambrosio Salvador, president of the league
 Agustín de la Rosa, fiscal
 Bonifacio Arévalo, treasurer
 Deodato Arellano, secretary and first supreme leader of Katipunan

Exile of Rizal 

 Domingo Franco, president and supreme leader
 Deodato Arellano, secretary-Treasurer
 Isidro Francisco, fiscal
 Apolinario Mabini, secretary
 Marcelo H. del Pilar, editor-in-chief
 Graciano López-Jaena, former editor-in-chief

Other members
 Andrés Bonifacio, supreme leader of Katipunan and led the Cry of Pugad Lawin
 Mamerto Natividad, one of the leaders of the revolution in Nueva Ecija
 Moises Salvador, master of lodge of the mason in Balagtas
 Numeriano Adriano, chief guard of lodge of the mason in Balagtas
 José A. Dizon, master of lodge of the mason in Taliba
 Ambrosio Rianzares Bautista, war adviser during First Philippine Republic, author of Philippine Declaration of Independence.
 Timoteo Lanuza, stated the depose to dispel the Spanish frail in the Philippine in 1889.
 Marcelino de Santos, bidder and assistant of La Solidaridad.
 Paulino Zamora, master of lodge of the mason in Lusong
 Procopio Bonifacio
 Juan Zulueta, member of lodge of the mason in Lusong, Member of Supreme Council.
 Doroteo Ongjunco, member of lodge of the mason in Lusong
 Arcadio del Rosario, publicist of lodge of the mason in Balagtas
 Timoteo Páez, a member of Supreme Council
 Mariano Limjap, financier of La Liga Filipina

See also

 Secret society

References

External links
Rizal's Liga, msc.edu.ph.

Philippine Revolution
Political organizations based in the Philippines
1892 establishments in the Philippines
Organizations based in Manila
Secret societies